The Javelina Formation is a geological formation in Texas. Dating has shown that the strata date to the Maastrichtian stage of the Late Cretaceous, approximately 70 to 66.5 million years old. The middle part of the formation has been dated to about 69 million years ago plus or minus 1 million years and the top situated near the Cretaceous–Paleogene boundary (in the overlying Black Peaks Formation), dated to 66 Ma ago. Dinosaur remains are among the fossils that have been recovered from the formation.

Age 
The typical age range of the Javelina Formation has been difficult to determine. Only one geological site in the Javelina Formation has thus far yielded the correct rock types for radiometric dating. The outcrop, situated in the middle strata of the formation about 90 meters below the K-Pg boundary and within the local range of Alamosaurus fossils and below two sites that have yielded Quetzalcoatlus fossils, was dated to 69.0 plus or minus 0.9 million years old in 2010. Indeterminate chasmosaurinae fossils have also been as well.

Fossil content

Vertebrate paleofauna

Flora 
Woody dicots and angiosperms have been unearthed in this formation. Plant fossils indicate that this area was a woodland habitat.

See also 

 List of dinosaur-bearing rock formations
 List of fossiliferous stratigraphic units in Texas
 Paleontology in Texas
 Cretaceous Texas
 Corsicana Marl
 El Picacho Formation
 Escondido Formation
 Kemp Clay 
 Nacatoch Sand
 Neylandville Marl

References

Further reading 

 S. L. Wick and T. M. Lehman. 2013. A new ceratopsian dinosaur from the Javelina Formation (Maastrichtian) of West Texas and implications for chasmosaurine phylogeny. Naturwissenschaften
 T. M. Lehman and A. B. Coulson. 2002. A juvenile specimen of the sauropod dinosaur Alamosaurus sanjuanensis from the Upper Cretaceous of Big Bend National Park, Texas. Journal of Paleontology 76(1):156-172
 A. R. Fiorillo. 1998. Preliminary report on a new sauropod locality in the Javelina Formation (Late Cretaceous), Big Bend National Park, Texas. In V. L. Santucci & L. McClelland (eds.), National Park Service Geologic Resources Division Technical Report NPS/NRGRD/GRDTR-98/01. National Park Service Paleontological Research Volume 3:29-31
 A. W. A. Kellner and W. Langston. 1996. Cranial remains of Quetzalcoatlus (Pterosauria, Azhdarchidae) from Late Cretaceous sediments of Big Bend National Park, Texas. Journal of Vertebrate Paleontology 16(2):222-231
 D. A. Lawson. 1976. Tyrannosaurus and Torosaurus, Maestrichtian dinosaurs from Trans-Pecos, Texas. Journal of Paleontology 50(1):158-164
 D. A. Lawson. 1975. Pterosaur from the latest Cretaceous of West Texas: discovery of the largest flying creature. Science 187:947-948

Geologic formations of Texas
Maastrichtian Stage of North America
Cretaceous geology of Texas
Sandstone formations
Siltstone formations
Mudstone formations
Shale formations
Conglomerate formations
Deltaic deposits
Fluvial deposits
Lacustrine deposits
Fossiliferous stratigraphic units of the United States
Paleontology in Texas